Perbaungan is a town and a district in Serdang Bedagai Regency, part of North Sumatra province, Indonesia.
Perbaungan is the gateway city when entering Serdang Bedagai Regency from the direction of Medan. It has an area of 111.62 km2, and had a population of 103,296 in 2015. Perbaungan was the capital of the Sultanate of Serdang in the past where the center of government of the Sultanate, namely Darul Arif Palace, was located in Galuh City.

References

Populated places in North Sumatra